Johann Adam may refer to:

 Johannes Adam (1871–?), German fencer
 Johann Adam (composer) (c. 1705–1779), German violist and composer
 Johann Friedrich Adam (1780–1838), botanist from St. Petersburg, Russia